Tayla Ford (born 2 July 1993) is a New Zealand freestyle wrestler. She competed in the women's freestyle 58 kg event at the 2014 Commonwealth Games where she won the bronze medal.

Born in Nelson, Ford is of Waikato Tainui descent.

References 

1993 births
Living people
New Zealand female sport wrestlers
New Zealand Māori sportspeople
Commonwealth Games medallists in wrestling
Commonwealth Games bronze medallists for New Zealand
Wrestlers at the 2014 Commonwealth Games
Wrestlers at the 2018 Commonwealth Games
Wrestlers at the 2022 Commonwealth Games
Wrestlers at the 2010 Summer Youth Olympics
20th-century New Zealand women
21st-century New Zealand women
Medallists at the 2014 Commonwealth Games
Medallists at the 2022 Commonwealth Games